Andrew Geoffrey Robertson  is an Australian public health doctor, public servant and Chief Health Officer of Western Australia since May 2019.

Career

Robertson served for the Royal Australian Navy from 1984 to 2003. During this time, he took part in three tours to Iraq as a Biological Weapons Chief Inspector for the United Nations Special Commission. Since then, he has been in the Navy's reserves, taking on the position of Director General Navy Health Reserves between July 2015 and December 2019.

He first joined the Western Australia Department of Health in October 2003, where he was in the position of Director, Disaster Preparedness and Management. In this role, he led an Australian medical team in the Maldives after the 2004 Indian Ocean Tsunami, managed WA's response to the 2005 Bali bombings, led a WA Health team into Indonesia after the 2006 Yogyakarta earthquake and worked as a radiation health adviser to the Australian Embassy after the Fukushima nuclear disaster.

Robertson was Deputy Chief Health Officer for Western Australia from 2008 to May 2018. In June 2018, he was appointed Acting Chief Health Officer, after Tarun Weeramanthri went on leave. Weeramanthri formally resigned on 20 October 2018, and Robertson continued as acting Chief Health Officer until May 2019, when he was promoted to Chief Health Officer, alongside gaining the position of assistant director general of public and aboriginal health.

Robertson was a prominent person in Western Australia's COVID-19 response, doing daily press conferences alongside Health Minister Roger Cook and Premier Mark McGowan.

Awards and honours
 Conspicuous Service Cross, 1999, "for outstanding achievement in the field of Nuclear, Biological and Chemical Defence while serving with the Office of the Surgeon General."
 Public Service Medal in the 2013 Australia Day Honours, "for outstanding public service as Director, Disaster Management and Preparedness within WA Health."

References

Living people
Year of birth missing (living people)
21st-century Australian medical doctors
21st-century Australian public servants
Australian health officials
Curtin University alumni
University of Sydney alumni
Recipients of the Conspicuous Service Cross (Australia)
Recipients of the Public Service Medal (Australia)